The Cape Metropole (greater Cape Town) has a wide variety of beaches divided into three regions by the Cape Peninsula:
 False Bay, including the long sandy beach running from Gordon's Bay to Muizenberg, and the smaller beaches along the East side of the Cape Peninsula
 Atlantic Seaboard, along the West (Atlantic) side of the Cape Peninsula
 Blaauwberg/West Coast, along the Blaauwberg coast running Northwards from Cape Town

The sea in False Bay is about 6 degrees warmer than the Atlantic Seaboard and the West Coast.

In 2011, Lonely Planet listed Cape Town second in its list of the world's top 10 beach cities.

False Bay

A long sandy beach runs more or less uninterrupted for the complete width of False Bay from Muizenberg to Gordon's Bay, forming the coast of the Cape Flats. Along the rocky Cape Peninsula, there are several smaller beaches below the mountains which are more protected from westerly swells than the beaches of the north shore. There is also a long sandy beach on the east side of the bay at the foot of the Kogelberg.
 Buffels Bay, Cape Peninsula
 Smitswinkel Bay
 Fishermans Beach
 Froggy Pond
 Windmill Beach
 Boulders Beach
 Long Beach, Simon's Town
 Glencairn
 Fish Hoek
 Kalk Bay
 St James
 Muizenberg
 Strandfontein
 Monwabisi Beach, Khayelitsha
 Macassar beach
 Strand
 Gordon's Bay
 Kogelbaai, south of Gordon's Bay

West coast of the Cape Peninsula

The Atlantic side of the Cape Peninsula faces West and thus is popular for expensive homes facing the sunset views. There are many beautiful beaches below the mountains of the peninsula. 

 Scarborough
 Crayfish factory Beach
 Kommetjie
 Noordhoek
 Hout Bay
 Sandy Bay
 Llandudno
 Camps Bay
 Glen Beach
 Clifton
 Sea Point

West Coast
The West Coast beaches are long, sandy beaches to the North of Cape Town. The wind and surf conditions make these beaches popular for surfing and kite-surfing. 

 Milnerton
 Sunset Beach
 Melkbosstrand
 Bloubergstrand

References

Cape Town
Geography of Cape Town
Tourist attractions in Cape Town